Peer-mediated instruction (PMI) is an approach in special education where peers of the target students are trained to provide necessary tutoring in educational, behavioral, and/or social concerns.(Chan et al., 2009). In PMI, peers may mediate by modeling appropriate behavior themselves, using prompting procedures to elicit appropriate behavior from the target students, and reinforcing appropriate behavior when it occurs. The peer tutors are chosen from the target students' classrooms, trained to mediate and closely observed during mediation.

Among the advantages noted to the technique, it takes advantage of the positive potential of peer pressure and may integrate target students more fully in their peer group. Conversely, it is time-consuming to implement and presents challenges in making sure that the peers follow proper techniques. However, studies have suggested it may be an effective technique for a wide range of students, including those with autism spectrum disorders.

Procedure
A student or students will be chosen from the target student's classroom to serve as a peer tutor. Garrison-Harrell et al. (as cited in Chan et al., 2009) suggested a systematic way to choosing the peers to be involved in the treatment based on social status and teacher judgment. Students were asked to list three peers they would like to play with on the playground, three peers they would invite to a party, and three peers they consider to be good friends. Teachers reviewed the top candidates, and selected the tutors based on social skills, language skills, school attendance and classroom behavior.

The student or students chosen as peers must be properly coached before the peer relationship begins, both to understand the importance of the intervention and the methods which should be used. Instructors may model behaviors to the peer tutors and may role play with the peer tutors, allowing the peer tutors to experience both parts in the PMI relationship. Other methods for training could include visual aids, reinforcement for correct implementation, instruction manuals and video instructions. Once the PMI relationship begins, the teacher provides on-going feedback, watching the peer at all times while the intervention is being used. (Chan et al., 2009).

Strengths and limitations
There are advantages of using PMI as an intervention strategy. First, there is never a shortage of peers to use, especially when implementing an intervention in a school or classroom. Second, students are influenced through observational learning by what they see their peers doing. Third, students are often less intimidated by a peer than they are a teacher, which makes instruction and feedback from peers potentially more effective. Fourth, it may not only offer short-term intervention benefits, but can also strengthen the target student's social ties within the classroom. Finally, research has been done with many different types of learners, including students with learning disabilities, behavior disorders and attention deficit hyperactivity disorder, which show that PMI may be effective for a wide range of students (Fuchs & Fuchs, 2005; Flood, Wilder, Flood & Masuda, 2002).  

In 2009, Research in Autism Spectrum Disorders published a paper by Chan et al. that concluded that PMI is a potentially effective intervention approach for students with Autism disorders.

Application to General Education classroom settings
Varying forms of peer-mediated instruction and interventions have been conducted in a great range of settings over the decades. Research has been conducted in educational and non-educational environments with positive outcomes in each. It is important to note that PMII strategies are not restricted or inclusive to education or special education, but have been found to be effective in each-as well as inclusive classroom settings. The following characteristics have been identified by Kulik & Kulik (1992), as central for successful implementation of peer-mediated instruction.
      
Expectations for student learning. Teachers should establish high expectation levels. No students are expected to fall below the level of learning needed to be successful at the next level of education.
Careful orientation to lessons. Teachers must clearly describe the relationship of a current lesson to previous study. Students are reminded of key concepts or skills previously covered.
Clear and focused instructions to participants.
Close teacher monitoring of student progress. Frequently formal and informal monitoring of student learning by teachers. Teachers must require that students are accountable for their product and learning.
Re-teach. If students show signs of confusion, misinterpretation or misunderstanding, the teacher must be responsible to teach again.
Use classtime for learning. Students must pace themselves and should be monitored for task completion.
Positive and personal teacher and student interaction. Cooperative Learning and Peer Tutoring Strategies are instruction methods of choice in many classrooms as they are noted for preventing and alleviating many social problems related to children, adolescents, and young adults.

See also
Classwide Peer Tutoring
Peer education
Peer feedback
Peer-led team learning
Peer mentoring
Peer tutor
Peer support

References
Chan, J.M., Lang, R., Rispoli, M., O’Reilly, M., Sigafoos, J., Cole, H. (2009). "Use of peer-mediated interventions in the treatment of autism spectrum disorders: A systematic review." Research in Autism Spectrum Disorders, 3, 876–889.
Flood, W.A., Wilder, D.A., Flood, A.L., Masuda, A. (2002). "Peer-mediated reinforcement plus prompting as treatment for off-task behavior in children with attention deficit hyperactivity disorder." Journal of Applied Behavior Analysis, 35(2), 199–204.
Fuchs, D. & Fuchs, L. (2005). "Peer-assisted learning strategies: Promoting word recognition, fluency, and reading comprehension in young children." Journal of Special Education, 39, 34–44.
Hall, T., & Stegila, A. (2003). Peer mediated instruction and intervention. Wakefield, MA: National Center on Accessing the General Curriculum.

Educational practices
Peer learning
Special education